The Roman Catholic Diocese of Ubon Ratchathani (Dioecesis Ubonratchathaniensis) is located in north-east Thailand. It is a suffragan diocese of the archdiocese of Thare and Nonseng.

In 2001, of the 7.7 million citizens, 24,760 were members of the Catholic Church. It is divided into 55 parishes, with 42 priests altogether.

History
The Vicariate Apostolic of Ubon was created on  May 7, 1953, when the Vicariate Apostolic of Thare was split. In 1965, the western part of the territory was separated and became the Vicariate Apostolic of Nakhon Ratchasima. On December 18, 1965, the Vicariate Apostolic was elevated to a diocese.

Cathedral
The cathedral of the diocese is the Cathedral of the Immaculate Conception, located in Ubon Ratchathani.

Bishops
Claudius Philippe Bayet, M.E.P.: May 7, 1953 - August 13, 1969 (resigned)
Claude Germain Berthold, M.E.P.: April 9, 1970 - May 24, 1976 (resigned)
Michael Bunluen Mansap:  May 21, 1976  - March 25, 2006 (retired)
Philip Banchong Chaiyara, C.Ss.R: appointed March 25, 2006

External links
Website of diocese
catholic-hierarchy.org

Ubon Ratchathani
Ubon Ratchathani
Amnat Charoen province
Maha Sarakham province
Roi Et province
Sisaket province
Surin province
Ubon Ratchathani province
Yasothon province